John Boothway (4 February 1919 – 1979) was an English footballer.

He played for Manchester City, Crewe Alexandra, Wrexham and Mossley. He became manager at Mossley before taking over at Northwich Victoria in 1955, where he stayed until 1957, which was followed by a spell with Runcorn Linnets from 1961 to 1971.

References

1919 births
Footballers from Manchester
1979 deaths
English footballers
Association football forwards
Manchester City F.C. players
Crewe Alexandra F.C. players
Wrexham A.F.C. players
Stoke City F.C. wartime guest players
Mossley A.F.C. players
Mossley A.F.C. managers
English football managers
Northwich Victoria F.C. managers